Lille nøtteaften is a Norwegian entertainment programme shown on TV 2 on Christmas Eve 2006 to 2008. 

The programme was an alternative to Kvelden før kvelden on NRK, but also served as the start of TV 2's Christmas programming. Kristian Ødegård was the presenter for the first two years, while Atle Antonsen presented the last. The programme consisted of different puzzles to be solved and guests were largely the same as appeared on TV 2-nøttene. It was produced by Seefood TV.

The programme had  viewers in 2008.

References

TV 2 (Norway) original programming
2000s Norwegian television series
2006 Norwegian television series debuts
2008 Norwegian television series endings
Christmas television specials